Cruéjouls (Languedocien: Cruèjols) is a former commune in the Aveyron department in southern France. On 1 January 2016, it was merged into the new commune of Palmas-d'Aveyron.

Population

See also
Communes of the Aveyron department

References

Former communes of Aveyron
Aveyron communes articles needing translation from French Wikipedia
Populated places disestablished in 2016